The 2007–08 A1 Grand Prix of Nations, Great Britain was an A1 Grand Prix race, held on May 4, 2008, at Brands Hatch, Kent, United Kingdom. It was the tenth and last meeting in the 2007-08 A1 Grand Prix season.

With their results in the Sprint race, Switzerland was crowned as the 2007-08 A1 Grand Prix champion.

Pre-race 
Switzerland only needed to score 3 points more than New Zealand to become champions. Third position was also contested, as Great Britain had the possibility of taking the place away from France

Qualifying 
At Great Britain's home track, Robbie Kerr qualified in pole position for the Sprint race, and on the front row for the Feature race. India earned their first pole position in A1GP, by qualifying on pole for the Feature race. New Zealand, the only team that mathematically could still beat Switzerland for the title, only qualified in 10th and 17th positions.

Sprint race 
After the start Great Britain took the lead ahead of USA, Ireland, Switzerland, India, Portugal, South Africa and New Zealand. On Lap 4, Robbie Kerr set the fastest lap.
China attacked Australia for 14th, and India pressured Switzerland for 4th place, but the positions remained the same during the race. On Lap 12, Cong Fu Cheng (China) slowed and fell from 15th to 21st. But some laps later, Cheng took fastest lap. Adam Carroll (Ireland) and Jonathan Summerton (USA) fought for 2nd position, whilst Great Britain won the Sprint race at their home track..
In finishing 4th, Neel Jani and Switzerland took the 2007-08 title.

Feature race 
It was 19 °C for the Feature race. Mandatory pit stops were to take place between laps 8 and 16, and the second window was between laps 32 and 40. Switzerland already took the title, but New Zealand, France and Great Britain were all in contention for the 2nd and 3rd places overall.

India grabbed the lead off the start, ahead of Great Britain and Ireland. On Lap 2, Pakistan and Australia collided and hit the barriers. The Safety car was deployed. Alexandre Negrão (Brazil) had to pit to change the car's nose, following an off-track excursion on the first lap. The Safety car pulled in on Lap 8. Next lap, Jeroen Bleekemolen (Netherlands) passed Adrian Zaugg (South Africa) for eighth. India has a slow pit stop, and Great Britain exit the pits ahead of them. Adam Carroll (Ireland) was closing and pushing Narain Karthikeyan (India). Canada received a drive-through penalty on Lap 13 and another on Lap 17. After the first set of mandatory pit stops, Great Britain leads India, Ireland, Germany, Portugal, France, Switzerland, China, Netherlands and USA.

On Lap 17, Ireland pulled alongside India to pass into Westfield and both cars touch. Ireland's front wing was damaged by contact with the left-rear wheel of India's car. After the wing flew off a lap later, Ireland suffered a puncture. After pitting, Ireland fell out of the points. On Lap 21, Canada received a third drive-through penalty. On Lap 23, Ireland set the fastest lap. The window for the second set of mandatory pit stops opened on Lap 32 and India, Great Britain and Germany all pit. India takes the lead back after a slow stop from Great Britain. On Lap 38, Germany is out in the gravel and Malaysia retires to the pits with engine problems. On Lap 44, Filipe Albuquerque (Portugal) passes Jonny Reid (New Zealand) for seventh.

India wins its second Feature race of the season. Great Britain is second ahead of Switzerland, China, France, Netherlands, Portugal, New Zealand, Italy and Indonesia who score their first points of the season. With their second place, Great Britain took third place in the overall standings from France.

After race 
On Monday 5 May, the A1GP's Gala Awards were celebrated at the Hilton Park Lane in London, at the end of its 2007-08 season. The awards presented at the event were:
Best event for Mexico City, Mexico,
Most improved team for A1 Team Ireland,
Rookie driver of the year for Robert Wickens (Canada),
Most spectacular overtaking move for Robert Wickens (Canada),
A1GP.com favourite team for A1 Team Malaysia,
A1 team PR excellence for A1 Team Netherlands,
Best presented team for A1 Team Ireland,
Best broadcaster for ESPN Star Sports.

Notes 
 The Switzerland team ran with the message:the A1 Team Switzerland car carried the message: Jo Siffert, 40th Anniversary, Brands Hatch which commemorated his 1968 British Grand Prix victory at Brands Hatch.
 It was the 32nd race weekend (64 starts).
 It was the 3rd race weekend in Brands Hatch and the 3rd in the United Kingdom.
 It was the first race weekend as Rookie driver for Frankie Provenzano (Italy).
Records:
India and Narain Karthikeyan earned their first pole position.
Lebanon have participated in 32 rounds (64 starts) without scoring a single point.
Neel Jani scored 307 points.

References

External links 
 Great Britain aces Sprint at home
 Sprint race: lap-by-lap
 Sprint race result
 India wins dramatic season finale
 Feature race: lap-by-lap
 Feature race result

A1 Grand Prix Of Nations, Great Britain, 2007-08
A1 Grand Prix Of Nations, Great Britain, 2007-08